Timeless Fly Tour was the concert tour by Japanese singer-songwriter Toshinobu Kubota in support of his fifteenth album Timeless Fly.

Background
The shows include songs from both Kubota's 2010 albums Timeless Fly / Love & Rain: Love Songs, as well as songs from his previous albums Shake It Paradise, Groovin', Such A Funky Thang!, and The Baddest. During the tour, Kubota also began a short tour known "Hall Tour 2010.

Synopsis
The show opened in darkness with Kubota appearing on stage to perform "Keep It Rock" in multi-colored leopard skinned robe, as the stage lights lit up the stage. After the performance, Kubota removes his robe to reveal his blue colored blazer, blue crew neck T-shirt, and blue dress pants. He then proceeds into performing "Daiyamondo no Inutachi", followed by "Tomorrow Waltz". During "The Sound of Rain", Kubota and his background singers perform while sitting on stools along with the stage lights turned down low. The following song "Is It Over?" is a duet with background vocalist "Yuri". The stage lights were once again turned down for the slow-grooves "The Sound of Carnival" and "Nyte Flyte". In the song "La La La Love Song", the dancers joined Kubota on stage. Olivia Burrell also performs Naomi Campbell's parts in the song.

The background singers perform the songs "Right Here" and "Human Nature". Kubota returns the stage and performs Michael Jackson's song "Rock with You" in brown trenchcoat, black vest, white shirt, and red pants. During the song "The Other Half", Kubota removes his trenchcoat and the lights fade out as the song ends. Kubota performs "Missing" without any backing vocalists from his background singers.

In the song "Star Light", the dancers return to the stage as Kubota dances with them at certain times. The performance also featured a bass rift solo. The show proceeded as Kubota performed "You Were Mine" which contained brief excerpt of "Another Star". The final song on the tour's setlist was "Soul Mate". Afterwards, Kubota gives an encore with "Oh, What a Night" in which he introduces his band, background singers, and dancers. He also performs "Love Rain (Koi no Ame)" and "Cymbals" as the final songs of the show.

Set list
 1. "Keep It Rock" 
 2. "Daiyamondo no Inutachi" 
 3. "Tomorrow Waltz" 
 4. "Amaoto" 
 5. "Is It Over?" (duet with Yuri)
 6. "The Sound Of Carnival" 
 7. "Nyte Flyte" 
 8. "La La La Love Song" (featuring Olivia Burrell) 
 9. "Right Here / Human Nature" (Only sung by the background singers )
 10. "Rock with You"
 11. "The Other Half"
 12. "Missing"
 13. "Indigo Waltz"
 14. "Star Light" 
 15. "You Were Mine" (contains excerpts from "Another Star")
 16. "Soul Mate"
 Encore
 17. "Oh, What a Night"
 18. "Love Rain (Koi no Ame)"
 19. "Cymbals"

Personnel
Band
 Bass: Carlos Henderson
 Deejay: DJ Mass
 Drums: Ralph Rolle
 Guitar: Ohnishi Yusuke
 Keyboards: Philip Woo, Kakizaki Yoichiro

Background Vocalists
 Yuri 
 Yoshida Hiroshi
 Olivia Burrell

Dancers
 Masako
 Nao

Tour dates

References

External links 
 ToshinobuKubota.com – Toshinobu Kubota's Official Website

2010 concert tours
Toshinobu Kubota